Arabinda Dhali is an Indian politician and member of the Biju Janata Dal (BJD). Dhali is a sixth term member of the Odisha Legislative Assembly and represented the Malkangiri from 1992 to 2000 and  the Jayadev constituency from 2009 to 2014. He was a former transport and corporation minister in BJD-BJP alliance. He had quit from BJP, Odisha to join  Bharatiya Janshakti Party on 30 April 2006. With Rama Chandra Panda, a  former Deputy Speaker of Odisha Legislative Assembly, joined Bharatiya Janshakti Party. Then on Monday, Mar 24 2008 he joined Samajwadi Party. Later, he joined Biju Janata Dal.

References 

https://news.webindia123.com/news/Articles/India/20080324/916464.html

Bharatiya Janata Party politicians from Odisha
Members of the Odisha Legislative Assembly
Living people
Biju Janata Dal politicians
Bharatiya Janshakti Party politicians
Year of birth missing (living people)
Odisha MLAs 2019–2024